Bob Giles (born 22 May 1930) is  a former Australian rules footballer who played with South Melbourne in the Victorian Football League (VFL).

Notes

External links 
		

Living people
1930 births
Australian rules footballers from Victoria (Australia)
Sydney Swans players